Raúl Rojas González (born 1955, in Mexico City) is an emeritus professor of Computer Science and Mathematics at the Free University of Berlin, and a renowned specialist in artificial neural networks. The FU-Fighters, football-playing robots he helped build, were world champions in 2004 and 2005. He is now leading an autonomous car project called Spirit of Berlin.

He and his team were awarded the Wolfgang von Kempelen Prize for his work on Konrad Zuse and the history of computers. Although most of his current research and teaching revolves around artificial intelligence and its applications, he holds academic degrees in mathematics and economics. 

In 2009 the Mexican government created the Raúl Rojas González Prize for scientific achievement by Mexican citizens. The first recipient of the prize was Luis Rafael Herrera Estrella, for contributions to plant biotechnology.

He ran for president at the Free University of Berlin in 2010.

History
Raúl Rojas was born on June 25th, 1955 in Mexico City to an engineer and a teacher. He attended university at the National Polytechnic Institute in Mexico City, where he majored in Mathematics and Physics. He moved to Germany in 1982 as a doctoral student in economics under the guidance of the political economist Elmar Altvater. The resulting dissertation was published under the title "Die Armut der Nationen - Handbuch zur Schuldenkrise von Argentinien bis Zaire" (The poverty of nations - Handbook of debt crisis from Argentina to Zaire). He became a full professor at University of Halle-Wittenberg in 1994, and later moved to the Free University of Berlin, where he remains today in the Informatics department. His wife, Margarita Esponda Argüero, is a professor in the same department.

Prizes
2001: Gründerpreis Multimedia of the German Ministry of Finance and Technology 
2002: European Academic Software Award
2004 and 2005: World champions in football robots with the FU-Fighters
2005: Wolfgang von Kempelen Prize for the History of Informatics
2009: Received the Heberto Castillo gold medal for contributions to science from the Mexico City government
2015: Was named Professor of the year by the Association of German Universities 
2015: Received the National Prize of Sciences and Arts by the Mexican Government in the category of Technology and Design

Works
Neural Networks - A Systematic Introduction Springer, Berlin, 1996. Available as a free e-book
Die Rechenmaschinen von Konrad Zuse, Springer, 1998.
The First Computers, MIT Press, Cambridge, 2000.
Encyclopedia of Computers and Computer History, Fitzroy-Dearborn, Chicago, 2001.
RoboCup 2002: Robot Soccer World Cup VI (Lecture Notes in Computer Science), 2002.

References

External links
Homepage of Raúl Rojas at the Free University of Berlin
Curriculum vitae of Raúl Rojas
FU-Fighters football robots
Autonomous car project

1955 births
Living people
National Autonomous University of Mexico alumni
Instituto Politécnico Nacional alumni
People from Mexico City
Mexican scientists
Academic staff of the Free University of Berlin